Gafa or GAFA may refer to:
Geometric and Functional Analysis (journal), a mathematical journal
Guangzhou Academy of Fine Arts, a Chinese national university
GAFA (Google, Amazon, Facebook, Apple), an abbreviation for four Big Tech companies

Names
Gafa, a diminutive of the Russian female first name Agafa
Gafa, a diminutive of the Russian male first name Agafon
Gafa, a diminutive of the Russian male first name Agafonik

People
Jordan Gafa (born 1990), American soccer player
Lorenzo Gafà (1638–1703), Maltese architect, brother of Melchiorre
Melchiorre Gafà or Melchiorre Cafà (1636–1667), Maltese sculptor, brother of Lorenzo
Matt Gafa (born 1978), Australian rules footballer

See also
Gafas, a village in Iran